Baeolidia harrietae is a species of sea slug, an aeolid nudibranch. It is a marine gastropod mollusc in the family Aeolidiidae.

Distribution
This species was described from Tomioka Bay, Japan, . It is also known from Shimoda, the Ryukyu Islands, Indonesia, the Marshall Islands, the Philippines, and Papua New Guinea.

Description
Baeolidia japonica has two colour forms. The body is translucent white or brown. The cerata are brown with white spots, or entirely covered with white pigment. The rhinophores have elongate papillae on all sides.

References

Aeolidiidae
Gastropods described in 1933